Events in the year 1213 in Norway.

Incumbents
Monarch: Inge II of Norway

Events

Arts and literature

Births

Deaths
Christina of Norway, Queen consort, daughter of Sverre Sigurdsson, spouse of Philip Simonsson.

References

Norway